Mason may refer to:

Occupations

 Mason, brick mason, or bricklayer, a craftsman who lays bricks to construct brickwork, or who lays any combination of stones, bricks, cinder blocks, or similar pieces
 Stone mason, a craftsman in the stone-cutting and shaping industry

Organizations

 Mason (Freemasonry), a general term for a Freemason
 George Mason University in Virginia, US 
 Its athletic program, the George Mason Patriots

People
 Mason (given name)
 Mason (surname), an English, French or Italian surname
 Mason sept of Clan Sinclair
 Mason (musician) (born 1980), Dutch electronic music producer, real name Iason Chronis

Places
 Mason, Illinois
 Mason, Grant County, Kentucky
 Mason, Magoffin County, Kentucky
 Masons, Maryland
 Mason, Michigan, in Ingham County
 Mason, Houghton County, Michigan
 Mason, Nevada
 Mason, New Hampshire
 Mason, Ohio
 Mason, Oklahoma
 Mason, South Dakota
 Mason, Tennessee
 Mason, Texas
 Mason, West Virginia
 Mason (town), Wisconsin
 Mason, Wisconsin, village within the town
 Mason City (disambiguation)
 Mason County (disambiguation)
 Mason Township (disambiguation)

Science and technology
 Mason (crater), on the Moon
 MASON (Java), an artificial-life computer simulation development environment
 Mason jar, a molded glass jar used in home canning to preserve food

Transport and military
 Mason (streetcar), first streetcar in the U.S.
 Mason Machine Works, Taunton, Massachusetts, known for its locomotives
 Mason Motor Car Company, a brass era car company
 Mason Truck, a subsidiary of Durant Motors of the 1920s
 USS Mason, several warships

Other uses
 Mason (American band), a rock band from Virginia
 Masons (novel), a novel by Alexey Pisemsky
 Mason bee (Osmia species), of the family Megachilidae

See also 

 Masone, a town in the Alps Region of northern Italy
 Macon (disambiguation)
 Marson (disambiguation)
 Masson (disambiguation)
 Justice Mason (disambiguation)
 Mason-Dixon line
 William Mason (locomotive), currently on display at the Baltimore and Ohio Railroad Museum